The History of Java is a book written by Sir Thomas Stamford Raffles, and published in 1817. It describes the history of the island of Java from ancient times. It was reprinted from a digital master by the Cambridge University Press in 2010.

Gallery

References

External links
The History of Java by Sir Stamford Raffles at the Internet Archive.
The History of Java restored ebook at Google Books.

History books about Indonesia
1817 non-fiction books